Alexis Klégou (born 25 January 1989) is a French-born Beninese tennis player.

Klégou has a career high ATP singles ranking of 633 achieved on 16 June 2014. He also has a career high ATP doubles ranking of 441 achieved on 5 November 2018. Klégou has won one ITF Futures singles title and six ITF Futures doubles titles.

Klégou has represented Benin at the Davis Cup, where he has a W/L record of 29–16.

References

External links

1989 births
Living people
Citizens of Benin through descent
Beninese male tennis players
French male tennis players
French sportspeople of Beninese descent
Sportspeople from Dunkirk
Texas A&M Aggies men's tennis players
Competitors at the 2019 African Games
African Games competitors for Benin
African Games medalists in tennis
African Games silver medalists for Benin
Competitors at the 2015 African Games
Black French sportspeople